In nuclear physics, transient equilibrium is a situation in which equilibrium is reached by a parent-daughter radioactive isotope pair where the half-life of the daughter is shorter than the half-life of the parent. Contrary to secular equilibrium, the half-life of the daughter is not negligible compared to parent's half-life. An example of this is a molybdenum-99 generator producing technetium-99 for nuclear medicine diagnostic procedures. Such a generator is sometimes called a  cow  because the daughter product, in this case technetium-99, is milked at regular intervals. Transient equilibrium occurs after four half-lives, on average.

Activity in transient equilibrium
The activity of the daughter is given by the Bateman equation:

In transient equilibrium, the Bateman equation cannot be simplified by assuming the daughter's half-life is negligible compared to the parent's half-life. The ratio of daughter-to-parent activity is given by:

Time of maximum daughter activity
In transient equilibrium, the daughter activity increases and eventually reaches a maximum value that can exceed the parent activity. The time of maximum activity is given by:

In the case of ^{99\!m}Tc-^{99}Mo generator, the time of maximum activity is approximately 24 hours which makes it convenient for medical use.

See also
 Bateman equation
 Secular equilibrium

References

Radioactivity